Blair County Courthouse is a historic courthouse building located at Hollidaysburg, Blair County, Pennsylvania.  It was built in 1875–1876, and is a "T" shaped stone building in the Gothic Revival style.  The entrance is flanked by two square, three-story towers with truncated pyramidal roofs.  The building generally features elaborate stonework and a five-story clock tower topped by a tall stone spire.  A three-story rear addition was built in 1906.

It was added to the National Register of Historic Places in 1976.

See also
 List of state and county courthouses in Pennsylvania

References

External links

Blair County website

Courthouses on the National Register of Historic Places in Pennsylvania
Gothic Revival architecture in Pennsylvania
Government buildings completed in 1876
Buildings and structures in Blair County, Pennsylvania
National Register of Historic Places in Blair County, Pennsylvania